Khim Tit (1896 – 1975) was a Cambodian politician who served as Prime Minister of Cambodia from April to July 1956.

References

1896 births
1975 deaths
20th-century Cambodian politicians 
Prime Ministers of Cambodia
People from Phnom Penh
People executed by the Khmer Rouge 
Sangkum politicians